The 1995 Liga Perdana season is the second season of the Liga Perdana (1994–97). A total of 15 teams participated in the season with 14 teams from Malaysia and one foreign team, Brunei.

Singapore has pulled from the league after a disagreement with Football Association of Malaysia and paved the way to the creation of S.League in 1996.

The season kicked off in 1995. Pahang dominated the season and ended up winning the title.

Teams

15 teams competing in the second season of Liga Perdana after Singapore pull from the league.

 Pahang
 Sarawak
 Kedah
 Sabah
 Selangor
 Perlis
 Negeri Sembilan
 Perak
 Kuala Lumpur
 Pulau Pinang
 Kelantan
 Terengganu
 Johor
 Malacca
 Brunei

League Table:-

1.Pahang  - 65 PTS (1995 Liga Perdana Champions)

2.Selangor  - 54 PTS

3.Sarawak  - 54 PTS

4.Kedah  - 45 PTS

5.Sabah  - 44 PTS

6.Johor  - 42 PTS

7.Perak  - 40 PTS

8.Terengganu  - 39 PTS

9.Brunei  - 36 PTS

10.Perlis  - 32 PTS

11.Negeri Sembilan  - 30 PTS

12.Kuala Lumpur  - 28 PTS

13.Malacca  - 26 PTS

14.Pulau Pinang  - 24 PTS

15.Kelantan  - 23 PTS

Champions

References

Liga Perdana (1994–1997) seasons
1
Malaysia